San Martín del Río is a municipality located in the province of Teruel, Aragon, Spain. According to the 2010 census the municipality has a population of 199 inhabitants.

San Martín del Río is located in the Jiloca Comarca. There are Bronze Age archaeological remains in nearby Cerro del Zorro site.

See also
Jiloca Comarca
List of municipalities in Teruel

References

External links 

 San Martín del Río in comarca del Jiloca
 Iglesia de San Martín Obispo

Municipalities in the Province of Teruel